Aval Appadithan 
( "She was like that") is an Indian Tamil-language soap opera that aired Monday through Friday on Jaya TV from 29 January 2013 to 6 December 2013 at 9:30PM IST and 9 December 2013 to 14 February 2014 8:30PM IST for 318 episodes.

The show starred Easwari Rao, Shilpa, Sreepadma and O.R. Sundhar  among others. It was director by  R.Elavarasan.

Airing history 
The show started airing on Jaya TV on 29 January 2013 and It aired on Monday through Friday 9:30PM IST. Later its timing changed Starting from Monday 9 December 2013, the show was shifted to 8:30PM IST time Slot. A new show named Chithiram Pesuthadi replaced this show at 8:30PM IST

References

External links
official website 
Jaya TV on Youtube
Aval Appadithan Serial on Youtube

Jaya TV television series
2013 Tamil-language television series debuts
2010s Tamil-language television series
Tamil-language television shows
2014 Tamil-language television series endings